Iboké is the name of four clustered villages in south-western Ivory Coast. They are in the sub-prefecture of Dapo-Iboké, Tabou Department, San-Pédro Region, Bas-Sassandra District. The villages are called Iboké 1, Iboké 2, Iboké 3, and Iboké 4.

Iboké was a commune until March 2012, when it became one of 1126 communes nationwide that were abolished.

Notes

Former communes of Ivory Coast
Populated places in Bas-Sassandra District
Populated places in San-Pédro Region